The 2017 All Stars match was the seventh annual representative exhibition All Stars match of Australian rugby. The match was played between the Indigenous All Stars and the World All Stars and for the first time, the match was played outside of Queensland. Mal Meninga took over as coach of the World All Stars from Wayne Bennett.

The Indigenous All Stars were selected through public vote from 7 November to 2 December 2016. Both sides were announced on 14 December.

Teams

1 - Will Chambers was originally selected to play but withdrew for the birth of his first child. Jack Bird was moved from the bench to Centre and Chambers was replaced by Bevan French.
2 - Sam Thaiday was originally selected to play but withdrew due to injury. Kyle Turner was moved from the bench to Lock and Thaiday was replaced by Tyrone Roberts.
3 - Adam Elliott was originally selected to play but withdrew due to injury. He was replaced by Chris Smith.
4 - Konrad Hurrell was originally selected to play but withdrew due to injury. He was replaced by Gerard Beale.
5 - Adam Reynolds was originally selected to play but withdrew due to injury. Moses Mbye was moved from the bench to Halfback and Reynolds was replaced by Damien Cook.
6 - Nate Myles was originally selected to play but withdrew due to injury. Reagan Campbell-Gillard was moved from the bench to Prop and Myles was replaced by Paul Vaughan.
7 - Jake Trbojevic was originally selected to play but withdrew due to injury. Tepai Moeroa was moved from the bench to Lock and Trbojevic was replaced by Mitchell Aubusson.
8 - Joseph Leilua was originally selected to play but withdrew due to injury. He was replaced by Jarrod Croker.
9 - Jarryd Hayne was originally selected to play but withdrew due to injury. David Mead was moved from Wing to Fullback and Hayne was replaced by Akuila Uate.
10 - Sosaia Feki was originally selected to play but withdrew due to injury. He was replaced by Chris McQueen.

Result

Women's All Stars match

For the sixth time, a Women's match was held as part of the fixture.

Women's Teams

References

All Stars Match
Rugby league in Newcastle, New South Wales
NRL All Stars match